Uma Dam, is an earthfill dam on the Uma river near Murtijapur, Akola district in the state of Maharashtra in India.

Specifications

Purpose
 Irrigation

See also
 Dams in Maharashtra
 List of reservoirs and dams in India

References

Dams in Akola district
Dams completed in 1981
1981 establishments in Maharashtra